Events in the year 1773 in Norway.

Incumbents
Monarch: Christian VII

Events

Arts and literature

Births
21 March - Nicolay Peter Drejer, military officer (died 1808)
2 May - Henrik Steffens, philosopher, scientist, and poet (died 1845)
27 July - Jacob Aall, historian and statesman (died 1844)
19 August - Johan Peter Strömberg, actor, dancer and theatre director, founder of the first public theatre of Norway (dead 1834).
4 October - Gabriel Lund,  merchant and representative at the Norwegian Constituent Assembly (died 1832)

Full date unknown
Johan Ernst Mejdell, jurist and politician

Deaths
23 September - Johan Ernst Gunnerus, bishop and botanist (born 1718)

Full date unknown
Jakob Klukstad, woodcarver (born 1705).

See also

References